The economy of Argentina is the second-largest national economy in South America, behind Brazil. Argentina is a developing country with a highly literate population, an export-oriented agricultural sector, and a diversified industrial base.

Argentina benefits from rich natural resources. Argentina's economic performance has historically been very uneven, with high economic growth alternating with severe recessions, particularly since the late twentieth century. Income maldistribution and poverty have increased since this period. Early in the twentieth century, Argentina had one of the ten highest per capita GDP levels globally. It was on par with Canada and Australia, and had surpassed both France and Italy.

Argentina's currency declined by about 50% in 2018 to more than 38 Argentine pesos per U.S. Dollar. As of that year, it is under a stand-by program from the International Monetary Fund. In 2019, the currency fell further by 25%. In 2020, it fell by 90%, in 2021, 68%, and a further 52% in 2022 (until July 20).

Argentina is considered an emerging market by the FTSE Global Equity Index (2018), and one of the G-20 major economies. In 2021, MCSI re-classified Argentina as a standalone market due to prolonged severe capital controls.

History

Before the 1880s, Argentina was a relatively isolated backwater, dependent on the salted meat, wool, leather, and hide industries for both the more significant part of its foreign exchange and the generation of domestic income and profits. The Argentine economy began to experience swift growth after 1880 through the export of livestock and grain raw materials, and British and French investment, marking the beginning of a fifty-year era of significant economic expansion and mass European immigration.

From 1880 to 1905, this expansion resulted in a 7.5-fold growth in GDP during its most vigorous period, averaging about 8% annually. One important measure of development, GDP per capita, rose from 35% of the United States average to about 80% during that period. Growth then slowed considerably, such that by 1941 Argentina's real per capita GDP was roughly half that of the U.S. Even so, from 1890 to 1950, the country's per capita income was similar to that of Western Europe; although income in Argentina remained considerably less evenly distributed. According to a study by Baten and Pelger and Twrdek (2009), where the authors compare anthropometric values, i.e., height with real wages, Argentina's GDP increased for the decades after 1870. Before 1910 however, the heights have been left unaffected. This, in turn, suggests that the increase in the population's welfare did not occur during the income expansion of the given period.

The Great Depression caused Argentine GDP to fall by a fourth between 1929 and 1932. Having recovered its lost ground by the late 1930s partly through import substitution, the economy continued to grow modestly during World War II (contrary to the recession caused by the previous world war). The war led to reduced availability of imports and higher prices for Argentine exports that combined to create a US$1.6 billion cumulative surplus, a third of which was blocked as inconvertible deposits in the Bank of England by the Roca–Runciman Treaty. Benefiting from innovative self-financing and government loans alike, value-added in manufacturing nevertheless surpassed that of agriculture for the first time in 1943, employed over 1 million by 1947, and allowed the need for imported consumer goods to decline from 40% of the total to 10% by 1950.

The populist administration of Juan Perón nationalized the Central Bank, railways, and other strategic industries and services from 1945 to 1955. The subsequent enactment of developmentalism after 1958, though partial, was followed by a good fifteen years. Inflation first became a chronic problem during this period (it averaged 26% annually from 1944 to 1974); but though it did not become fully "developed," from 1932 to 1974, Argentina's economy grew almost fivefold (or 3.8% in annual terms) while its population only doubled. While unremarkable, this expansion was well-distributed and so resulted in several noteworthy changes in Argentine society —most notably the development of the largest proportional middle class (40% of the population by the 1960s) in Latin America as well as the region's highest-paid, most unionized working class.

However, the economy declined during the military dictatorship from 1976 to 1983 and for some time afterward. The dictatorship's chief economist, José Alfredo Martínez de Hoz, advanced a corrupt, anti-labor policy of financial liberalization that increased the debt burden and interrupted industrial development and upward social mobility. Over 400,000 companies of all sizes went bankrupt by 1982, and neoliberal economic policies prevailing from 1983 through 2001 failed to reverse the situation.

Record foreign debt interest payments, tax evasion, and capital flight resulted in a balance of payments crisis that plagued Argentina with severe stagflation from 1975 to 1990, including a bout of hyperinflation in 1989 and 1990. Attempting to remedy this situation, economist Domingo Cavallo pegged the peso to the U.S. dollar in 1991 and limited the money supply's growth. His team then embarked on a path of trade liberalization, deregulation, and privatization. Inflation dropped to single digits, and GDP grew by one third in four years.

External economic shocks and a dependency on volatile short-term capital and debt to maintain the overvalued fixed exchange rate diluted benefits, causing erratic economic growth from 1995 and the eventual collapse in 2001. That year and the next, the economy suffered its sharpest decline since 1930; by 2002, Argentina had defaulted on its debt. Its GDP had declined by nearly 20% in four years, unemployment reached 25%, and the peso had depreciated 70% after being devalued and floated.

Argentina's socio-economic situation has since been steadily improving. Expansionary policies and raw materials exports triggered a rebound in GDP from 2003 onward. This trend has been primarily maintained, creating over five million jobs and encouraging domestic consumption and fixed investment. Social programs were strengthened, and a number of important firms privatized during the 1990s were renationalized beginning in 2003. These include the postal service, ASA (the water utility serving Buenos Aires), Pension funds (transferred to ANSES), Aerolíneas Argentinas, the energy firm YPF, and the railways.

The economy nearly doubled from 2002 to 2011, growing an average of 7.1% annually and around 9% for five consecutive years between 2003 and 2007. Real wages rose by around 72% from their low point in 2003 to 2013. The global recession did affect the economy in 2009, with growth slowing to nearly zero; but high economic growth then resumed, and GDP expanded by around 9% in both 2010 and 2011. Foreign exchange controls, austerity measures, persistent inflation, and downturns in Brazil, Europe, and other important trade partners, contributed to slower growth beginning in 2012, however. Growth averaged just 1.3% from 2012 to 2014, and rose to 2.4% in 2015.

The Argentine government bond market is based on GDP-linked bonds, and investors, both foreign and domestic, netted record yields amid renewed growth. Argentine debt restructuring offers in 2005 and 2010 resumed payments on the majority of its almost US$100 billion in defaulted bonds and other debt from 2001.

Holdouts controlling 7% of the bonds, including some small investors, hedge funds, and vulture funds led by Paul Singer's Cayman Islands-based NML Capital Limited, rejected the 2005 and 2010 offer to exchange their defaulted bonds. Singer, who demanded US$832 million for Argentine bonds purchased for US$49 million in the secondary market in 2008, attempted to seize Argentine government assets abroad and sued to stop payments from Argentina to the 93% who had accepted the earlier swaps despite the steep discount. According to estimates by Morgan Stanley, bondholders who instead accepted the 2005 offer of 30 cents on the dollar had by 2012 received returns of about 90%. Argentina settled with virtually all holdouts in February 2016 at the cost of US$9.3 billion; NML received US$2.4 billion, a 392% return on the original value of the bonds.

While the Argentine Government considers debt leftover from illegitimate governments unconstitutional odious debt, it has continued servicing this debt despite the annual cost of around US$14 billion and despite being nearly locked out of international credit markets with annual bond issues since 2002 averaging less than US$2 billion (which precludes most debt rollover).

Nevertheless, Argentina has continued to hold successful bond issues, as the country's stock market, consumer confidence, and overall economy continue to grow. The country's successful, US$16.5 billion bond sale in April 2016 was the largest in emerging market history.

In May 2018, Argentina's government asked the International Monetary Fund for its intervention, with an emergency loan for a $30 billion bailout, as reported by Bloomberg.

In May 2018, the official estimated inflation had peaked up to 25 percent a year, and on 4 May Argentina's central bank raised interest rates on pesos to 40 percent from 27.25 percent, which is the highest in the world, since the national currency had lost 18% of its value since the beginning of the year.

In 2019 the inflation was considered the highest in 28 years according to the index, ascending to 53.8%.

To the cause of the quarantine in 2020, in April, 143,000 SMEs will not be able to pay salaries and fixed expenses for the month, even with government assistance, so they will have to borrow or increase their capital contribution, and approximately 35,000 companies consider closing their business. even so, the president remains firm in his decision to maintain the state of total quarantine. Despite cuts in the payment chain, some project 180 total days and calculate 5% of companies that fell in May.

In 2023, the inflation rate in Argentina now passed 100% of the country's GDP. This was the first time inflation had crossed into triple digits since the country was hit by hyperinflation during the early 90s.

Data 

The following table shows the main economic indicators in 1980–2021 (with IMF staff estimates in 2022–2027). Inflation below 5% is in green.

Sectors

Agriculture

 

Argentina is one of the world's major agricultural producers, ranking among the top producers in most of the following, exporters of beef, citrus fruit, grapes, honey, maize, sorghum, soybeans, squash, sunflower seeds, wheat, and yerba mate. Agriculture accounted for 9% of GDP in 2010, and around one fifth of all exports (not including processed food and feed, which are another third). Commercial harvests reached 103 million tons in 2010, of which over 54 million were oilseeds (mainly soy and sunflower), and over 46 million were cereals (mainly maize, wheat, and sorghum).

Argentina is the largest producer in the world of yerba mate, one of the 5 largest producers in the world of soy, maize, sunflower seed, lemon and pear, one of the 10 largest producers in the world of barley, grape, artichoke, tobacco and cotton, and one of the 15 largest producers in the world of wheat, sugarcane, sorghum and grapefruit.

In 2018, Argentina was the 3rd largest producer of soy in the world, with 37.7 million tons produced (behind only the US and Brazil); the 4th largest producer of maize in the world, with 43.5 million tons produced (behind only the US, China and Brazil); the 12th largest producer of wheat in the world, with 18.5 million tons produced; the 11th largest producer in the world of sorghum, with 1.5 million tons produced; the 10th largest producer of grape in the world, with 1.9 million tons produced, besides having produced 19 million tons of sugarcane, mainly in the province of Tucumán - Argentina produces near 2 million tons of sugar with the produced cane. In the same year Argentina produced 4.1 million tons of barley, being one of the 20 largest producers in the world of this cereal.  The country is also one of the world's largest producers of sunflower seed: in 2010, it was the 3rd largest producer in the world with 2.2 million tons. In 2018, Argentina also produced 2.3 million tons of potato, almost 2 million tons of lemon, 1.3 million tons of rice, 1 million tons of orange, 921 thousand tons of peanut, 813 thousand tons of cotton, 707 thousand tons of onion, 656 thousand tons of tomato, 565 thousand tons of pear, 510 thousand tons of apple, 491 thousand tons of oats, 473 thousand tons of beans, 431 thousand tons of tangerine, 302 thousand tons of yerba mate, 283 thousand tons of carrot, 226 thousand tons of peach, 194 thousand tons of cassava, 174 thousand tons of olives, 174 thousand tons of banana, 148 thousand tons of garlic, 114 thousand tons of grapefruit, 110 thousand tons of artichoke, in addition to smaller productions of other agricultural products.

In livestock, Argentina was, in 2019, the 4th world producer of beef, with a production of 3 million tons (only behind USA, Brazil and China), the 4th world producer of honey, the 10th world producer of wool, the world's 13th largest producer of chicken meat, the world's 23rd largest producer of pork, the 18th largest producer of cow's milk and the world's 14th largest producer of chicken egg.

Soy and its byproducts, mainly animal feed and vegetable oils, are major export raw materials with one fourth of the total; cereals added another 10%. Cattle-raising is also a major industry, though mostly for domestic consumption; beef, leather and dairy were 5% of total exports. Sheep-raising and wool are important in Patagonia, though these activities have declined by half since 1990. Biodiesel, however, has become one of the fastest growing agro-industrial activities, with over US$2 billion in exports in 2011.

Fruits and vegetables made up 4% of exports: apples and pears in the Río Negro valley; rice, oranges and other citrus in the northwest and Mesopotamia; grapes and strawberries in Cuyo (the west), and berries in the far south. Cotton and tobacco are major crops in the Gran Chaco, sugarcane and chile peppers in the northwest, and olives and garlic in the west. Yerba mate tea (Misiones), tomatoes (Salta) and peaches (Mendoza) are grown for domestic consumption. Organic farming is growing in Argentina, and the nearly 3 million hectares (7.5 million acres) of organic cultivation is second only to Australia. Argentina is the world's fifth-largest wine producer, and fine wine production has taken major leaps in quality. A growing export, total viticulture potential is far from having been met. Mendoza is the largest wine region, followed by San Juan.

Government policy towards the lucrative agrarian sector is a subject of, at times, contentious debate in Argentina. A grain embargo by farmers protesting an increase in export taxes for their products began in March 2008, and, following a series of failed negotiations, strikes and lockouts largely subsided only with the 16 July, defeat of the export tax-hike in the Senate.

Argentine fisheries bring in about a million tons of catch annually, and are centered on Argentine hake, which makes up 50% of the catch; pollock, squid, and centolla crab are also widely harvested. Forestry has long history in every Argentine region, apart from the pampas, accounting for almost 14 million m³ of roundwood harvests. Eucalyptus, pine, and elm (for cellulose) are also grown, mainly for domestic furniture, as well as paper products (1.5 million tons). Fisheries and logging each account for 2% of exports.

Natural resources

Mining and other extractive activities, such as gas and petroleum, are growing industries, increasing from 2% of GDP in 1980 to around 4% today. The northwest and San Juan Province are the main regions of activity. Coal is mined in Santa Cruz Province. Metals and minerals mined include borate, copper, lead, magnesium, sulfur, tungsten, uranium, zinc, silver, titanium, and gold, whose production was boosted after 1997 by the Bajo de Alumbrera mine in Catamarca Province and Barrick Gold investments a decade later in San Juan. Metal ore exports soared from US$200 million in 1996 to US$1.2 billion in 2004, and to over US$3 billion in 2010.

In mining, in 2019, Argentina was the 4th largest world producer of lithium, the 9th largest world producer of silver, the 17th largest world producer of gold and the 7th largest world producer of boron.

Around 35 million m³ each of petroleum and petroleum fuels are produced, as well as 50 billion m³ of natural gas, making the nation self-sufficient in these staples, and generating around 10% of exports. The most important oil fields lie in Patagonia and Cuyo. A network of pipelines (next to Mexico's, the second-longest in Latin America) send raw product to Bahía Blanca, center of the petrochemical industry, and to the La Plata-Greater Buenos Aires-Rosario industrial belt.

Industry
The World Bank lists the top producing countries each year, based on the total value of production. According to the 2019 list, Argentina has the 31st most valuable industry in the world (57.7 billion dollars), behind Mexico, Brazil and Venezuela, but ahead of Colombia, Peru and Chile.

In 2019, Argentina was the 31st world producer of steel, the 28th producer of vehicles, the 22nd world producer of beer, the 4th world producer of soybean oil and the 3rd world producer of sunflower oil, among other industrial products.

Manufacturing is the largest single sector in the nation's economy (15% of GDP), and is well-integrated into Argentine agriculture, with half the nation's industrial exports being agricultural in nature. Based on food processing and textiles during its early development in the first half of the 20th century, industrial production has become highly diversified in Argentina. Leading sectors by production value are: Food processing and beverages; motor vehicles and auto parts; refinery products, and biodiesel; chemicals and pharmaceuticals; steel and aluminium; and industrial and farm machinery; electronics and home appliances. These latter include over three million big ticket items, as well as an array of electronics, kitchen appliances and cellular phones, among others.

Argentina's auto industry produced 791,000 motor vehicles in 2013, and exported 433,000 (mainly to Brazil, which in turn exported a somewhat larger number to Argentina); Argentina's domestic new auto market reached a record 964,000 in 2013. This marked a peak in vehicle production, by 2021 production had fallen to 434,753 vehicles. Vehicles remain Argentina's top export to Brazil, accounting for $3.1bil in exports in 2021.

Beverages are another significant sector, and Argentina has long been among the top five wine producing countries in the world; beer overtook wine production in 2000, and today leads by nearly two billion liters a year to one. Other manufactured goods include: glass and cement; plastics and tires; lumber products; textiles; tobacco products; recording and print media; furniture; apparel and leather.

Most manufacturing is organized in the 314 industrial parks operating nationwide as of 2012, a fourfold increase over the past decade. Nearly half the industries are based in the Greater Buenos Aires area, although Córdoba, Rosario, and Ushuaia are also significant industrial centers; the latter city became the nation's leading center of electronics production during the 1980s. The production of computers, laptops, and servers grew by 160% in 2011, to nearly 3.4 million units, and covered two-thirds of local demand. Argentina has also become an important manufacturer of cell phones, providing about 80% of all devices sold in the country. Farm machinery, another important rubric historically dominated by imports, was similarly replaced by domestic production, which covered 60% of demand by 2013. Production of cell phones, computers, and similar products is actually an "assembly" industry, with the majority of the higher technology components being imported, and the designs of products originating from foreign countries. High labour costs for Argentina assembly work tend to limit product sales penetration to Latin America, where regional trade treaties exist.

Construction permits nationwide covered over 15 million m2 (160 million ft²) in 2013. The construction sector accounts for over 5% of GDP, and two-thirds of construction is for residential buildings.

Argentine electric output totaled over 133 billion kWh in 2013. This was generated in large part through well developed natural gas and hydroelectric resources. Nuclear energy is also of high importance, and the country is one of the largest producers and exporters, alongside Canada and Russia of cobalt-60, a radioactive isotope widely used in cancer therapy.

Services
The service sector is the largest contributor to total GDP, accounting for over 60%. Argentina enjoys a diversified service sector, which includes well-developed social, corporate, financial, insurance, real estate, transport, communication services, and tourism.

The telecommunications sector has been growing at a fast pace, and the economy benefits from widespread access to communications services. These include: 77% of the population with access to mobile phones, 95% of whom use smartphones; Internet (over 32 million users, or 75% of the population); and broadband services (accounting for nearly all 14 million accounts). Regular telephone services, with 9.5 million lines, and mail services are also robust. Total telecom revenues reached more than $17.8 billion in 2013, and while only one in three retail stores in Argentina accepted online purchases in 2013 E-commerce reached US$4.5 billion in sales.

Trade in services remained in deficit, however, with US$15 billion in service exports in 2013 and US$19 billion in imports. Business Process Outsourcing became the leading Argentine service export, and reached US$3 billion. Advertising revenues from contracts abroad were estimated at over US$1.2 billion.

Tourism is an increasingly important sector and provided 4% of direct economic output (over US$17 billion) in 2012; around 70% of tourism sector activity by value is domestic.

Banking

Argentine banking, whose deposits exceeded US$120 billion in December 2012, developed around public sector banks, but is now dominated by the private sector. The private sector banks account for most of the 80 active institutions (over 4,000 branches) and holds nearly 60% of deposits and loans, and as many foreign-owned banks as local ones operate in the country. The largest bank in Argentina by far, however, has long been the public Banco de la Nación Argentina. Not to be confused with the Central Bank, this institution now accounts for 30% of total deposits and a fifth of its loan portfolio.

During the 1990s, Argentina's financial system was consolidated and strengthened. Deposits grew from less than US$15 billion in 1991 to over US$80 billion in 2000, while outstanding credit (70% of it to the private sector) tripled to nearly US$100 billion.

The banks largely lent US dollars and took deposits in Argentine pesos, and when the peso lost most of its value in early 2002, many borrowers again found themselves hard pressed to keep up. Delinquencies tripled to about 37%. Over a fifth of deposits had been withdrawn by December 2001, when Economy Minister Domingo Cavallo imposed a near freeze on cash withdrawals. The lifting of the restriction a year later was bittersweet, being greeted calmly, if with some umbrage, at not having these funds freed at their full U.S. dollar value. Some fared worse, as owners of the now-defunct Velox Bank defrauded their clients of up to US$800 million.

Credit in Argentina is still relatively tight. Lending has been increasing 40% a year since 2004, and delinquencies are down to less than 2%. Still, credit outstanding to the private sector is, in real terms, slightly below its 1998 peak, and as a percent of GDP (around 18%) quite low by international standards. The prime rate, which had hovered around 10% in the 1990s, hit 67% in 2002. Although it returned to normal levels quickly, inflation, and more recently, global instability, have been affecting it again. The prime rate was over 20% for much of 2009, and around 17% since the first half of 2010.

Partly a function of this and past instability, Argentines have historically held more deposits overseas than domestically. The estimated US$173 billion in overseas accounts and investment exceeded the domestic monetary base (M3) by nearly US$10 billion in 2012.

Tourism

According to World Economic Forum's 2017 Travel & Tourism Competitiveness Report, tourism generated over US$22 billion, or 3.9% of GDP, and the industry employed more than 671,000 people, or approximately 3.7% of the total workforce. Tourism from abroad contributed US$5.3 billion, having become the third largest source of foreign exchange in 2004. Around 5.7 million foreign visitors arrived in 2017, reflecting a doubling in visitors since 2002 despite a relative appreciation of the peso.

Argentines, who have long been active travelers within their own country, accounted for over 80%, and international tourism has also seen healthy growth (nearly doubling since 2001). Stagnant for over two decades, domestic travel increased strongly in the last few years, and visitors are flocking to a country seen as affordable, exceptionally diverse, and safe.

Foreign tourism, both to and from Argentina, is increasing as well. INDEC recorded 5.2 million foreign tourist arrivals and 6.7 million departures in 2013; of these, 32% arrived from Brazil, 19% from Europe, 10% from the United States and Canada, 10% from Chile, 24% from the rest of the Western Hemisphere, and 5% from the rest of the world. Around 48% of visitors arrived by commercial flight, 40% by motor travel (mainly from neighboring Brazil), and 12% by sea. Cruise liner arrivals are the fastest growing type of foreign tourism to Argentina; a total of 160 liners carrying 510,000 passengers arrived at the Port of Buenos Aires in 2013, an eightfold increase in a just a decade.

GDP by value added

Energy

Electricity generation in Argentina totaled 133.3 billion Kwh in 2013. The electricity sector in Argentina constitutes the third largest power market in Latin America. It mainly still relies on centralised generation by natural gas power generation (51%), hydroelectricity (28%), and oil-fired generation (12%). Resource estimates of unconventional shale gas and tight oil in the Vaca Muerta oil field and elsewhere are estimated to be the world's third-largest. In 2017, Argentina was the 18th largest producer in the world (and the largest producer in Latin America) of natural gas.

Despite the country's large untapped wind and solar potential new renewable energy technologies and distributed energy generation are barely exploited. Wind energy is the fastest growing among new renewable sources. Fifteen wind farms have been developed since 1994 in Argentina, the only country in the region to produce wind turbines. The 55 MW of installed capacity in these in 2010 will increase by 895 MW upon the completion of new wind farms begun that year. Solar power is being promoted with the goal of expanding installed solar capacity from 6 MW to 300, and total renewable energy capacity from 625 MW to 3,000 MW. At the end of 2021 Argentina was the 21st country in the world in terms of installed hydroelectric power (11.3 GW), the 26th country in the world in terms of installed wind energy (3.2 GW) and the 43rd country in the world in terms of installed solar energy (1.0 GW).

Argentina is in the process of commissioning large centralised energy generation and transmission projects. An important number of these projects are being financed by the government through trust funds, while independent private initiative is limited as it has not fully recovered yet from the effects of the Argentine economic crisis.

The first of the three nuclear reactors was inaugurated in 1974, and in 2015 nuclear power generated 5% of the country's energy output.

The electricity sector was unbundled in generation, transmission and distribution by the reforms carried out in the early 1990s. Generation occurs in a competitive and mostly liberalized market, in which 75% of the generation capacity is owned by private utilities. In contrast, the transmission and distribution sectors are highly regulated and much less competitive than generation.

Infrastructure

Argentina's transport infrastructure is relatively advanced, and at a higher standard than the rest of Latin America. Having tripled in length in the last decade, multilane expressways now connect several major cities with more under construction. Expressways are, however, currently inadequate to deal with local traffic, as over 12 million motor vehicles were registered nationally as of 2012 (the highest, proportionately, in the region).

After decades of declining service and inadequate maintenance, most intercity passenger services shut down in 1992 following the privatization of the country's railways and the breaking up of the state rail company, while thousands of kilometers fell into disuse. Outside Greater Buenos Aires most rail lines still in operation are freight related, carrying around 23 million tons a year. The metropolitan rail lines in and around Buenos Aires remained in great demand owing in part to their easy access to the Buenos Aires Underground, and the commuter rail network with its  length carries around 1.4 million passengers daily.

In April 2015, by overwhelming majority the Argentine Senate passed a law which re-created Ferrocarriles Argentinos as Nuevos Ferrocarriles Argentinos, effectively re-nationalising the country's railways. In the years leading up to this move, the country's railways had seen significant investment from the state, purchasing new rolling stock, re-opening lines closed under privatization and re-nationalising companies such as the Belgrano Cargas freight operator. Some of these re-opened services include the General Roca Railway service to Mar del Plata, the Tren a las Nubes tourist train and the General Mitre Railway service from Buenos Aires to Córdoba. while brand new services include the Posadas-Encarnación International Train.

Inaugurated in 1913, the Buenos Aires Underground was the first underground rail system built in Latin America, the Spanish speaking world and the Southern Hemisphere. No longer the most extensive in South America, its  of track carry a million passengers daily.

This includes an extensive network of canals, though Argentina is blessed with ample natural waterways as well, the most significant among these being the Río de la Plata, Paraná, Uruguay, Río Negro, and Paraguay rivers. The Port of Buenos Aires, inaugurated in 1925, is the nation's largest; it handled 11 million tons of freight and transported 1.8 million passengers in 2013.

Aerolíneas Argentinas is the country's main airline, providing both extensive domestic and international service. LADE is a military-run commercial airline that flies extensive domestic services. The nation's 33 airports handled air travel totalling 25.8 million passengers in 2013, of which domestic flights carried over 14.5 million; the nation's two busiest airports, Jorge Newbery and Ministro Pistarini International Airports, boarded around 9 million flights each.

Foreign trade

In 2020, Argentina was the 46th largest exporter (by merchandise exports) in the world (US$65 billion), 0.3% of the global total.

Argentine exports are fairly well diversified. However, although agricultural raw materials are over 20% of the total exports, agricultural goods still account for over 50% of exports when processed foods are included. Soy products alone (soybeans, vegetable oil) account for almost one fourth of the total. Cereals, mostly maize and wheat, which were Argentina's leading export during much of the twentieth century, make up less than one tenth now.

Industrial goods today account for over a third of Argentine exports. Motor vehicles and auto parts are the leading industrial export, and over 12% of the total merchandise exports. Chemicals, steel, aluminum, machinery, and plastics account for most of the remaining industrial exports. Trade in manufactures has historically been in deficit for Argentina, however, and despite the nation's overall trade surplus, its manufacturing trade deficit exceeded US$30 billion in 2011. Accordingly, the system of non-automatic import licensing was extended in 2011, and regulations were enacted for the auto sector establishing a model by which a company's future imports would be determined by their exports (though not necessarily in the same rubric).

A net energy importer until 1987, Argentina's fuel exports began increasing rapidly in the early 1990s and today account for about an eighth of the total; refined fuels make up about half of that. Exports of crude petroleum and natural gas have recently been around US$3 billion a year. Rapidly growing domestic energy demand and a gradual decline in oil production, resulted in a US$3 billion energy trade deficit in 2011 (the first in 17 years) and a US$6 billion energy deficit in 2013.

Argentine imports have historically been dominated by the need for industrial and technological supplies, machinery, and parts, which have averaged US$50 billion since 2011 (two-thirds of total imports). Consumer goods including motor vehicles make up most of the rest. Trade in services has historically in deficit for Argentina, and in 2013 this deficit widened to over US$4 billion with a record US$19 billion in service imports. The nation's chronic current account deficit was reversed during the 2002 crisis, and an average current account surplus of US$7 billion was logged between 2002 and 2009; this surplus later narrowed considerably, and has been slightly negative since 2011.

Major Trade Partners 
The following table shows the largest trading partners for Argentina in 2021 by total trade value in billions of USD.

Foreign investment
Foreign direct investment in Argentina is divided nearly evenly between manufacturing (36%), natural resources (34%), and services (30%). The chemical and plastics sector (10%) and the automotive sector (6%) lead foreign investment in local manufacturing; oil and gas (22%) and mining (5%), in natural resources; telecommunications (6%), finance (5%), and retail trade (4%), in services. Spain was the leading source of foreign direct investment in Argentina, accounting for US$22 billion (28%) in 2009; the U.S. was the second leading source, with $13 billion (17%); and China grew to become the third-largest source of FDI by 2011. Investments from the Netherlands, Brazil, Chile, and Canada have also been significant; in 2012, foreign nationals held a total of around US$112 billion in direct investment.

Several bilateral agreements play an important role in promoting U.S. private investment. Argentina has an Overseas Private Investment Corporation (OPIC) agreement and an active program with the U.S. Export-Import Bank. Under the 1994 U.S.–Argentina Bilateral Investment Treaty, U.S. investors enjoy national treatment in all sectors except shipbuilding, fishing, nuclear-power generation, and uranium production. The treaty allows for international arbitration of investment disputes.

Foreign direct investment (FDI) in Argentina, which averaged US$5.7 billion from 1992 to 1998 and reached in US$24 billion in 1999 (reflecting the purchase of 98% of YPF stock by Repsol), fell during the crisis to US$1.6 billion in 2003. FDI then accelerated, reaching US$8 billion in 2008. The global crisis cut this figure to US$4 billion in 2009; but inflows recovered to US$6.2 billion in 2010. and US$8.7 billion in 2011, with FDI in the first half of 2012 up by a further 42%.

FDI volume remained below the regional average as a percent of GDP even as it recovered, however; Kirchner Administration policies and difficulty in enforcing contractual obligations had been blamed for this modest performance. The nature of foreign investment in Argentina nevertheless shifted significantly after 2000, and whereas over half of FDI during the 1990s consisted in privatizations and mergers and acquisitions, foreign investment in Argentina became the most technologically oriented in the region – with 51% of FDI in the form of medium and high-tech investment (compared to 36% in Brazil and 3% in Chile).

Issues

The economy recovered strongly from the 2001–02 crisis, and was the 21st largest in purchasing power parity terms in 2011; its per capita income on a purchasing power basis was the highest in Latin America. A lobby representing US creditors who refused to accept Argentina's debt-swap programmes has campaigned to have the country expelled from the G20. These holdouts include numerous vulture funds which had rejected the 2005 offer, and had instead resorted to the courts in a bid for higher returns on their defaulted bonds. These disputes had led to a number of liens against central bank accounts in New York and, indirectly, to reduced Argentine access to international credit markets.

The government under President Mauricio Macri announced to be seeking a new loan from the International Monetary Fund in order to avoid another economic crash similar to the one in 2001. The May 2018 announcement comes at a time of high inflation and falling interest rates. The loan would reportedly be worth $30 billion.

Following 25 years of boom and bust stagnation, Argentina's economy doubled in size from 2002 to 2013, and officially, income poverty declined from 54% in 2002 to 5% by 2013; an alternative measurement conducted by CONICET found that income poverty declined instead to 15.4%. Poverty measured by living conditions improved more slowly, however, decreasing from 17.7% in the 2001 Census to 12.5% in the 2010 Census. Argentina's unemployment rate similarly declined from 25% in 2002 to an average of around 7% since 2011 largely because of both growing global demand for Argentine raw materials and strong growth in domestic activity.

Given its ongoing dispute with holdout bondholders, the government has become wary of sending assets to foreign countries (such as the presidential plane, or artworks sent to foreign exhibitions) in case they might be impounded by courts at the behest of holdouts.

The government has been accused of manipulating economic statistics.

Reliability of official CPI estimates
Official CPI inflation figures released monthly by INDEC have been a subject of political controversy since 2007 through 2015. Official inflation data are disregarded by leading union leaders, even in the people sector, when negotiating pay rises. Some private-sector estimates put inflation for 2010 at around 25%, much higher than the official 10.9% rate for 2010. Inflation estimates from Argentina's provinces are also higher than the government's figures. The government backed up the validity of its data, but has called in the International Monetary Fund to help it design a new nationwide index to replace the current one.

The official government CPI is calculated based on 520 products, however the controversy arises from these products not being specified, and thus how many of those products are subject to price caps and subsidies. Economic analysts have been prosecuted for publishing estimates that disagree with official statistics. The government enforces a fine of up to 500,000 pesos for providing what it calls "fraudulent inflation figures". Beginning in 2015, the government again began to call for competitive bids from the private sector to provide a weekly independent inflation index.

Inflation
High inflation has been a weakness of the Argentine economy for decades. Inflation has been unofficially estimated to be running at around 25% annually since 2008, despite official statistics indicating less than half that figure; these would be the highest levels since the 2002 devaluation. A committee was established in 2010 in the Argentine Chamber of Deputies by opposition Deputies Patricia Bullrich, Ricardo Gil Lavedra, and others to publish an alternative index based on private estimates. Food price increases, particularly that of beef, began to outstrip wage increases in 2010, leading Argentines to decrease beef consumption per capita from 69 kg (152 lb) to 57 kg (125 lb) annually and to increase consumption of other meats.

Consumer inflation expectations of 28 to 30% led the national mint to buy banknotes of its highest denomination (100 pesos) from Brazil at the end of 2010 to keep up with demand. The central bank pumped at least 1 billion pesos into the economy in this way during 2011.

, the government said that inflation was at 15.3%; approximately half that of some independent estimates. Inflation remained at around 18.6% in 2015 according to an International Monetary Fund estimate; but following a sharp devaluation enacted by the Mauricio Macri administration on 17 December, inflation reignited during the first half of 2016 – reaching 42% according to the Finance Ministry.

Supermarkets in Argentina have adopted electronic price tags, allowing prices to be updated quicker.

In the second quarter of 2019, reports suggested that the economy of the country is sinking, inflation is rising and the currency is depreciating. Despite the country receiving one of the largest IMF financial support programmes ever given to any nation, Argentina's poverty rose to 32% from 26% the previous year. In August 2019, as an attempt to stabilise the economy, the government decided to impose restrictions on foreign currency purchases.

The inflation rate in Argentina rose to 52.3 percent in February 2022 from 50.7 percent in the prior month, the steepest increase since September. In August  the interest rate was hiked to 69.5% as inflation further deteriorated hitting a 20-year high at 70% driven by many factors among them the 2021–2022 inflation surge and forecasted to top 90% by the end of the year. Inflation hit past 100% in February 2023 for the first time since 1991.

Argentine workers have protested the inflation holding funerals to mourn the "death of (their) wages" and stating that "inflation destroys savings, impedes planning, and discourages investment."

Income distribution
In relation to other Latin American countries, Argentina has a moderate to low level of income inequality. Its Gini coefficient is of about 0.427 (2014). The social gap is worst in the suburbs of the capital, where beneficiaries of the economic rebound live in gated communities, and many of the poor live in slums known as villas miserias.

In the mid-1970s, the most affluent 10% of Argentina's population had an income 12 times that of the poorest 10%. That figure had grown to 18 times by the mid-1990s, and by 2002, the peak of the crisis, the income of the richest segment of the population was 43 times that of the poorest. These heightened levels of inequality had improved to 26 times by 2006, and to 16 times at the end of 2010. Economic recovery after 2002 was thus accompanied by significant improvement in income distribution: in 2002, the richest 10% absorbed 40% of all income, compared to 1.1% for the poorest 10%; by 2010, the former received 29% of income, and the latter, 1.8%.

Argentina has an inequality-adjusted human development index of 0.729, compared to 0.578 and 0.709 for neighboring Brazil and Chile, respectively. The 2010 Census found that poverty by living conditions still affect 1 in 8 inhabitants, however; and while the official, household survey income poverty rate (based on U$S 100 per person per month, net) was 4.7% in 2013, the National Research Council estimated income poverty in 2010 at 22.6%, with private consulting firms estimating that in 2011 around 21% fell below the income poverty line. The World Bank estimated that, in 2013, 3.6% subsisted on less than US$3.10 per person per day.

See also

 List of Latin American and Caribbean countries by GDP growth
 List of Latin American and Caribbean countries by GDP (nominal)
 List of Latin American and Caribbean countries by GDP (PPP)
 Argentina and the World Bank
 Economic history of Argentina

References

Notes

Further reading
Bulmer-Thomas, Victor. The Economic History of Latin America since Independence (New York: Cambridge University Press). 2003.
Argentina: Life After Default Article looking at how Argentina has, for the most part, recovered from its crisis in 2002

External links

 Argentine Economy Ministry 
 Argentine Central Bank 
 Argentina's Economic Recovery: Policy Choices and Implications from the Center for Economic and Policy Research
 Argentina economic data
 Argentina Trade Statistics
 Argentina Export, Import, Trade Balance
Tariffs applied by Argentina as provided by ITC's ITC Market Access Map, an online database of customs tariffs and market requirements
 Private Inflation data from The Billion Prices Project at Massachusetts Institute of technology 

 
Argentina